Hopewell Center (also, Hopewell Centre) is a hamlet in Ontario County, New York, United States. It lies at an elevation of 837 feet (255 m).

References

Hamlets in New York (state)
Hamlets in Ontario County, New York